The International Classification of Headache Disorders (ICHD) is a detailed hierarchical classification of all headache-related disorders published by the International Headache Society. It is considered the official classification of headaches by the World Health Organization, and, in 1992, was incorporated into the 10th edition of their International Classification of Diseases (ICD-10). Each class of headache contains explicit diagnostic criteria—meaning that the criteria include quantities rather than vague terms like several or usually—that are based on clinical and laboratory observations.

The ICHD was first published in 1988 (now known as the ICHD-1). A second version, the ICHD-2, was published in 2004. The most current version, ICHD-3, was published in 2018.

Hierarchy

Primary headaches

ICHD 1, ICD10 G43: Migraine

Migraine without aura
Migraine with aura
Childhood periodic syndromes that are commonly precursors of migraine
Retinal migraine
Complications of migraine
Migraine-triggered seizure
Probable migraine

ICHD 2, ICD10 G44.2: Tension-type headache (TTH)
Infrequent episodic tension-type headache
Frequent episodic tension-type headache
Chronic tension-type headache
Probable tension-type headache

ICHD 3, ICD10 G44.0: Cluster headache and other trigeminal autonomic cephalalgias
Cluster headache
Paroxysmal hemicrania
Short-lasting unilateral neuralgiform headache with conjunctival injection and tearing (SUNCT)
Probable trigeminal autonomic cephalalgia

ICHD 4, ICD10 G44.80: Other primary headaches
 Primary stabbing headache
 Primary cough headache
 Primary exertional headache
 Primary headache associated with sexual activity
 Hypnic headache
 Primary thunderclap headache
 Hemicrania continua
 New daily persistent headache (NDPH)

Secondary headaches

ICHD 5, ICD10 G44.88: Headache attributed to head and/or neck trauma
Acute post-traumatic headache
 Acute post-traumatic headache attributed to moderate or severe head injury
 Acute post-traumatic headache attributed to mild head injury
 Chronic post-traumatic headache
 Chronic post-traumatic headache attributed to moderate or severe head injury
 Chronic post-traumatic headache attributed to mild head injury
 Acute headache attributed to whiplash injury
 Chronic headache attributed to whiplash injury
 Headache attributed to traumatic intracranial haematoma
 Headache attributed to epidural haematoma
 Headache attributed to subdural haematoma
 Headache attributed to other head and/or neck trauma
 Acute headache attributed to other head and/or neck trauma
 Chronic headache attributed to other head and/or neck trauma
 Post-craniotomy headache
 Acute post-craniotomy headache
 Chronic post-craniotomy headache

ICHD 6, ICD10 G44.81: Headache attributed to cranial or cervical vascular disorder
Headache attributed to ischaemic stroke or transient ischaemic attack
 Headache attributed to ischaemic stroke (cerebral infarction)
 Headache attributed to transient ischaemic attack (TIA)
 Headache attributed to non-traumatic intracranial haemorrhage
 Headache attributed to intracerebral haemorrhage
 Headache attributed to subarachnoid haemorrhage (SAH)
 Headache attributed to unruptured vascular malformation
 Headache attributed to saccular aneurysm
 Headache attributed to arteriovenous malformation (AVM)
 Headache attributed to dural arteriovenous fistula
 Headache attributed to cavernous angioma
 Headache attributed to encephalotrigeminal or leptomeningeal angiomatosis (Sturge Weber syndrome)
 Headache attributed to arteritis
 Headache attributed to giant cell arteritis (GCA)
 Headache attributed to primary central nervous system (CNS) angiitis
 Headache attributed to secondary central nervous system (CNS) angiitis
 Carotid or vertebral artery pain
 Headache or facial or neck pain attributed to arterial dissection
 Post-endarterectomy headache
 Carotid angioplasty headache
 Headache attributed to intracranial endovascular procedures
 Angiography headache
 Headache attributed to cerebral venous thrombosis (CVT)
 Headache attributed to other intracranial vascular disorder
 CADASIL (cerebral autosomal dominant arteriopathy with subcortical infarcts and leukoencephalopathy)
 MELAS (eitochondrial encephalopathy, lactic acidosis and stroke-like episodes)
 Headache attributed to benign angiopathy of the central nervous system
 Headache attributed to pituitary apoplexy

ICHD 7, ICD10 G44.82: Headache attributed to non-vascular intracranial disorder
Headache attributed to high cerebrospinal fluid pressure
 Headache attributed to idiopathic intracranial hypertension (IIH)
 Headache attributed to intracranial hypertension secondary to metabolic, toxic or hormonal causes
 Headache attributed to intracranial hypertension secondary to hydrocephalus
 Headache attributed to low cerebrospinal fluid pressure
 Post-dural puncture headache
 CSF fistula headache
 Headache attributed to spontaneous (or idiopathic) low CSF pressure
 Headache attributed to non-infectious inflammatory disease
 Headache attributed to neurosarcoidosis
 Headache attributed to aseptic (non-infectious) meningitis
 Headache attributed to other non-infectious inflammatory disease
 Headache attributed to lymphocytic hypophysitis
 Headache attributed to intracranial neoplasm
 Headache attributed to increased intracranial pressure or hydrocephalus caused by neoplasm
 Headache attributed directly to neoplasm
 Headache attributed to carcinomatous meningitis
 Headache attributed to hypothalamic or pituitary hyper- or hyposecretion
 Headache attributed to intrathecal injection
 Headache attributed to epileptic seizure
 Hemicrania epileptica
 Post-seizure headache
 Headache attributed to Chiari malformation type I (CM1)
 Syndrome of transient headache and neurological deficits with cerebrospinal fluid
lymphocytosis (HaNDL)
 Headache attributed to other non-vascular intracranial disorder

ICHD 8, ICD10 G44.4 or G44.83: Headache attributed to a substance or its withdrawal
Headache induced by acute substance use or exposure
 Nitric oxide (NO) donor-induced headache
 Immediate NO donor-induced headache
 Delayed NO donor-headache
 Phosphodiesterase (PDE) inhibitor-induced headache
 Carbon monoxide-induced headache
 Alcohol-induced headache.
 Immediate alcohol-induced headache
 Delayed alcohol-induced headache
 Headache induced by food components and additives
 Monosodium glutamate-induced headache
 Cocaine-induced headache
 Cannabis-induced headache
 Histamine-induced headache
 Immediate histamine-induced headache
 Delayed histamine-induced headache
 Calcitonin gene-related peptide (CGRP)-induced headache
 Immediate CGRP-induced headache
 Delayed CGRP-induced headache
 Headache as an acute adverse event attributed to medication used for other indications
 Headache attributed to other acute substance use or exposure
 Medication-overuse headache (MOH)
 Ergotamine-overuse headache
 Triptan-overuse headache
 Analgesic-overuse headache
 Opioid-overuse headache
 Combination analgesic-overuse headache
 Medication-overuse headache attributed to combination of acute medications
 Headache attributed to other medication overuse
 Probable medication-overuse headache
 Headache as an adverse event attributed to chronic medication
 Exogenous hormone-induced headache
 Headache attributed to substance withdrawal
 caffeine-withdrawal headache
 opioid-withdrawal headache
 Oestrogen-withdrawal headache
 Headache attributed to withdrawal from chronic use of other substances

ICHD 9, ICD10 G44.821 or G44.881: Headache attributed to infection
 Headache attributed to intracranial infection
 Headache attributed to bacterial meningitis
 Headache attributed to lymphocytic meningitis
 Headache attributed to encephalitis
 Headache attributed to brain abscess
 Headache attributed to subdural empyema
 Headache attributed to systemic infection
 Headache attributed to systemic bacterial infection
 Headache attributed to systemic viral infection
 Headache attributed to other systemic infection
 Headache attributed to HIV/AIDS
 Chronic post-infection headache
 Chronic post-bacterial meningitis headache

ICHD 10, ICD10 G44.882: Headache attributed to disorder of homeostasis
 Headache attributed to hypoxia and/or hypercapnia
 High-altitude headache
 Diving headache
 Sleep apnoea headache
 Dialysis headache
 Headache attributed to arterial hypertension
 Headache attributed to phaeochromocytoma
 Headache attributed to hypertensive crisis without hypertensive encephalopathy
 Headache attributed to hypertensive encephalopathy
 Headache attributed to pre-eclampsia
 Headache attributed to eclampsia
 Headache attributed to acute pressor response to an exogenous agent
 Headache attributed to hypothyroidism
 Headache attributed to fasting
 Cardiac cephalalgia
 Headache attributed to other disorder of homoeostasis

ICHD 11, ICD10 G44.84: Headache or facial pain attributed to disorder of cranium, neck, eyes, ears, nose, sinuses, teeth, mouth or other facial or cranial structures
 Headache attributed to disorder of cranial bone
 Headache attributed to disorder of neck
 Cervicogenic headache
 Headache attributed to retropharyngeal tendonitis
 Headache attributed to craniocervical dystonia
 Headache attributed to disorder of eyes
 Headache attributed to acute glaucoma
 Headache attributed to refractive errors
 Headache attributed to heterophoria or heterotropia (latent or manifest squint)
 Headache attributed to ocular inflammatory disorder
 Headache attributed to disorder of ears
 Headache attributed to rhinosinusitis
 Headache attributed to disorder of teeth, jaws or related structures
 Headache or facial pain attributed to temporomandibular joint (TMJ) disorder
 Headache attributed to other disorder of cranium, neck, eyes, ears, nose, sinuses,
teeth, mouth or other facial or cervical structures

ICHD 12, ICD10 R51: Headache attributed to psychiatric disorder
 Headache attributed to somatization disorder
 Headache attributed to psychotic disorder

Cranial neuralgias, central and primary facial pain and other headaches

ICHD 13, ICD10 G44.847, G44.848, or G44.85: Cranial neuralgias and central causes of facial pain
ICHD 13.1, ICD10 G44.847: Trigeminal neuralgia

Glossopharyngeal neuralgia
Nervus intermedius neuralgia
Superior laryngeal neuralgia
Nasociliary neuralgia
Supraorbital neuralgia
Other terminal branch neuralgias
Occipital neuralgia
Neck-tongue syndrome
External compression headache
Cold-stimulus headache
Constant pain caused by compression, irritation or distortion of cranial nerves or upper cervical roots by structural lesions
Optic neuritis
Ocular diabetic neuropathy
Head or facial pain attributed to herpes zoster
Head or facial pain attributed to acute herpes zoster
Post-herpetic neuralgia
Tolosa–Hunt syndrome
Opthalamoplegic migraine
Central causes of facial pain
Anaesthesia dolorosa
Central post-stroke pain
Facial pain attributable to multiple sclerosis
Persistent idiopathic facial pain (the IHS's preferred term for atypical facial pain)
Burning mouth syndrome
Other cranial neuralgia or other centrally mediated facial pain

ICHD 14, ICD10 R51: Other headache, cranial neuralgia, central or primary facial pain
Headache not elsewhere classified
Headache unspecified

References 

Headaches